Angela Postma (born August 6, 1971) is a former freestyle swimmer from the Netherlands, who won the gold medal in the 50 m butterfly at the European Sprint Swimming Championships 1994 in Stavanger, Norway. At the same tournament the sprinter, coached by Henk Tempelman, also captured a silver medal (50 m freestyle) and a bronze medal (4×50 m freestyle relay). Postma competed at the 1996 Summer Olympics in Atlanta, Georgia, where she finished in tenth position in the 50 m freestyle.

References

1971 births
Living people
Dutch female freestyle swimmers
Dutch female butterfly swimmers
Olympic swimmers of the Netherlands
Swimmers at the 1996 Summer Olympics
People from Ede, Netherlands
Sportspeople from Gelderland
Medalists at the FINA World Swimming Championships (25 m)
European Aquatics Championships medalists in swimming
20th-century Dutch women
20th-century Dutch people